A media monitoring service, a press clipping service or a clipping service as known in earlier times, provides clients with copies of media content, which is of specific interest to them and subject to changing demand; what they provide may include documentation, content, analysis, or editorial opinion, specifically or widely. These services tend to specialize their coverage by subject, industry, size, geography, publication, journalist, or editor.  The printed sources, which could be readily monitored, greatly expanded with the advent of telegraphy and submarine cables in the mid- to late-19th century; the various types of media now available proliferated in the 20th century, with the development of radio, television, the photocopier and the World Wide Web. Though media monitoring is generally used for capturing content or editorial opinion, it also may be used to capture advertising content.

Media monitoring services have been variously termed over time, as new players entered the market, new forms of media were created, and as new uses from available content developed.  An existing group may provide such a monitoring service, as it relates to their main purpose, while a monitoring agency generally provides such as their main business.  Alternative terms for these monitoring services as well as the information they provide include:

Press clipping service or agency
Media cutting service or agency
Information logistics service
Media intelligence
Media information services

History

Since mass media traditionally was limited solely to print media, naturally the monitoring was also limited to these media. The world's first press clipping agency was established in London in 1852 by a Polish newsagent named Romeike. Actors, writers, musicians and artists would visit his shop to look for articles about themselves in his Continental stock. It was then that Romeike realised that he could turn this into a profitable business. 

An agency named "L'Argus de la presse" was established in Paris in 1879 by Alfred Cherie, who offered a press-clipping service to Parisian actors, enabling them to buy reviews of their work rather than purchasing the whole newspaper.

As radio and later television broadcasting were introduced in the 20th century, press clipping agencies began to expand their services into the monitoring of these broadcast media, and this task was greatly facilitated by the development of commercial audio and video tape recording systems in the 1950s and 1960s. With the growth of the Internet in the 1990s, media monitoring service extended their services to the monitoring of online information sources using new digital search and scan technologies to provide output of interest to their clients.

Then, in 1998, the now defunct WebClipping website was the first firm to start monitoring Internet based news media, moving the industry toward tracking digital news quickly.

Typically, individual or organisational clients – e. g. private companies and corporations, charities, government departments and ministries – will subscribe to a media monitoring service to keep track of what is being said about them, their field of operations, their competitors, or other specified topics of interest.

Industry
The news monitoring industry provides government agencies, corporations, public relations professionals, and other organizations access to news information created by the media. Generally monitoring print, broadcast, and internet content for any mention of specific subjects of interest, a news monitoring company will analyze and provide feedback to their client in the form of press clippings, monitoring reports, and media analysis.

Evolution
From a cut and clip service, media clipping today has expanded to incorporate technology with information.  Media monitoring clients can now opt to include print, broadcast and online to capture all their media exposure.  While this technology has allowed some of the process to be automated, many media monitoring agencies still offer the services of trained professionals to review and validate results.

Service delivery happens at three fronts. Clients may get their original hard copy clips through traditional means (mail/overnight delivery) or may opt for digital delivery.  Digital delivery allows the end user to receive via email all the relevant news of the company, competition and industry daily, with updates as they break.  The same news may also be indexed (as allowed by copyright laws) in a searchable database to be accessed by subscribers. Another option of this service is auto-analysis, wherein the data can be viewed & compared in different formats.

Every organization that uses PR invariably uses news monitoring as well. In addition to tracking their own publicity, self-generated or otherwise, news monitoring clients also use the service to track competition or industry specific trends or legislation, to build a contact base of reporters, experts, leaders for future reference, to audit the effectiveness of their PR campaigns, to verify that PR, marketing and sales messages are in sync, and to measure impact on their target market. City, State, and Federal agencies use news monitoring services to stay informed in regions they otherwise would not be able to monitor themselves and to verify that the public information disseminated is accurate, accessible in multiple formats and available to the public. Some monitoring services specialize in one or more areas of press clipping, TV and radio monitoring, or internet tracking. Media analysis is also offered by most news monitoring services.

Television news monitoring companies, especially in the United States, capture and index closed captioning text and search it for client references. Some TV monitoring companies employ human monitors who review and abstract program content; other services rely on automated search programs to search and index stories.

Online media monitoring services utilize automated software called spiders or robots (bots) to automatically monitor the content of free online news sources including newspapers, magazines, trade journals, TV station and news syndication services.  Online services generally provide links but may also provide text versions of the articles.  Results may or may not be verified for accuracy by the online monitoring service.  Most newspapers do not include all of their print content online and some have web content that does not appear in print.

In the United States, there are trade associations formed to share best practices which include the North American Conference of Press Clipping Services and the International Association of Broadcast Monitors.

Law cases

Two parallel cases developed in 2012, one in the United States, and one in the United Kingdom. In each case, the legality of temporary copies and the online media monitoring service offered to clients, was in dispute. Essentially the two cases covered the same issue (media clippings shown to clients online) and with the same defendant, Meltwater Group. The plaintiff differed, being a UK copyright collection society (UK) rather than Associated Press (US), but upon parallel grounds.

The activity was ruled unlawful in the US (under the "fair use" doctrine). In the UK under UK and EU copyright law, service providers need a licence. Users are also licensed. If users only viewed the original source without getting a headline or snippet or printing the article this is not an infringement, and temporary copies to enable a lawful purpose are themselves lawful, but in practice services for business do not work this way.

See also
Media intelligence
 DHS media monitoring services

Footnotes

Further reading
 O.H. Oyen, "Newspaper Readers Can Always Get Work," Chicago Daily Tribune, Jan. 15, 1905, pg. E3.
 Richard K. Popp, "Information, Industrialization, and the Business of Press Clippings, 1880-1925," ''Journal of American History," vol. 101, no. 2 (Sept. 2014), pp. 427–453.

News
Public relations
Transcription (linguistics)